Feminist HCI is a subfield of human-computer interaction (commonly called HCI) that focuses on helping the field of HCI build interactions that pay attention to gender, equity, and social justice in research and in the design process.

Overview
Feminist HCI sets a stage for the explicit inclusion of feminism in HCI. Starting with Shaowen Bardzell's 2010 article "Feminist HCI: Taking Stock and Outlining an Agenda for Design", feminist HCI looks to the design and evaluation of interactive computing systems from a feminist lens. Building off of the epistemology of feminist standpoint theory, feminist HCI is focused on highlighting the values of feminism in HCI work, like equity, diversity, social justice, and also to understand the influence gender plays on the design and evaluation of interactive systems. Given that feminism is a heterogeneous concept, there is no singular methodology for undertaking feminist HCI projects. However, Isabel Prochner's broad-reaching research on feminist design shows that feminist perspectives in design can often support:
Emphasis on human life and prosperity over output and growth
Following best practices in labor/ international production /trade
Choosing an empowering workspace
Engaging in non-hierarchical/ interdisciplinary/ collaborative work
Addressing user needs at multiple levels, including support for pleasure/ fun/ happiness
Creating thoughtful products for female users
Creating good jobs through production/ execution/ sale of the design solution
Bridging the gap between feminism and HCI, Feminist HCI has applications in theory, methodology, user research, and evaluation that will allow practitioners to critique systems already in place as well as generate new HCI practices focused on gender, equity, and social justice. Theoretical contributions of feminism like the masculinity of technology and the social production of gender point towards the importance of addressing gender and equity directly in HCI.

Qualities of feminist interaction
Building off of interaction design, feminist HCI builds on six core qualities to feminist interaction:
 Pluralism: Building on feminist standpoint theory, this quality argues that human experience is too varied to be captured within the concept of universalism, thus pluralism, or heterogeneity, in design is of critical importance to HCI work.  
 Participation: Engaging users as active contributors to the design process (e.g., participatory design) is important for understanding and respecting the full range of contributions users can make. Feminist HCI argues that this work should occur alongside traditional usability testing.  
 Advocacy: Articulating concerns with the values that get built into a design by championing for well-motivated of ideas for creating just design choices. For instance, a needs analysis may reinforce discriminatory design behavior like design choices criticized by Gender HCI. Participatory approaches, like participatory design, support advocacy.
 Ecology: Maintaining a focus on the larger social structures (ecosystems) that a design impacts throughout the process of development. For example, the way a house is designed has an impact on structuring the lives of people who live in it (see feminism and modern architecture for additional information). Likewise, HCI artifacts exist within a larger ecosystem that impacts both the design process and the user. 
 Embodiment: Contrasting from earlier HCI notions of a disembodied user (such as mental models), concentrating on the material attributes of human-computer interactions is essential for understanding the way differences and commonalities impact interaction. 
 Self-disclosure: Bringing to light the foundational assumptions inherent in everyday design allows us to understand how well the design model of a user matches the actual users.

Select findings
The following presents a sampling of results from research utilizing feminist HCI:

Six qualities of feminist interaction in an activist online community
 Jill Dimond et al.'s studies of Hollaback! outlines how activist CSCW systems embody feminist HCI in concrete ways. In particular, these studies examine feminist HCI through activist online communities describing how the six qualities of feminist interaction design play out in the work and experiences of site designers and site users.
Designing postpartum technologies by and for mothers using feminist HCI
 Catherine D'Ignazio et al.'s work highlights participation, advocacy, and ecology to improve breast pump technologies. By getting input from more than 1000 mothers, researchers put forth a number of improvements that could be made to the breast pump while discussing the wider impacts this type of research can make on improving postpartum technologies broadly.
Exploring implementation feminist HCI qualities in design when the users of a site design it themselves
 Casey Fiesler et al.'s work details how an online fan fiction community, consisting mostly of women, designed their own site. This site, Archive of Our Own, embedded the values most important to the community, such as accessibility, an embodiment of the feminist design quality pluralism.

See also
Feminism
Gender HCI
Human-computer interaction
Interaction design
Usability
Topics in human-computer interaction

References

Human–computer interaction
Feminism